The Crim Dell bridge is a wooden bridge on the College of William & Mary’s campus in Williamsburg, Virginia, United States and is considered one of the College's most scenic areas. Crim Dell itself is actually the pond that the bridge crosses over, but the bridge is commonly referred to as Crim Dell.

The bridge was opened on William & Mary's first-ever Parents' Day in 1966. Davis Paschall, the College President at the time, had the idea to build a newer, more elaborate bridge than the bare, unpainted one that had previously occupied the spot. For a short time, the spot was considered to be the grounds for a new library, but was ultimately decided against. Crim Dell was funded by three primary sources: the 1964 senior class gift, a man by the name of David Reed Baer who was a friend of the College, and the family of John W. H. Crim. John was a distinguished alumnus (Class of 1901) of the College. Before this, the site had in fact been a gully in which passersby threw their garbage; the pond was created by artificial damming just below the location of the future bridge.

On a mounted plaque near the bridge is a quote by Paschall to commemorate Crim Dell's dedication on May 7, 1966 (see picture). It reads:

…that one may walk in beauty, discover the serenity of the quiet moment, and dispel the shadows.

Traditions and urban legends
The Crim Dell bridge and pond, aside from being important facets of the College's campus, are also the center of several myths and traditions.

Lover's bridge
It is rumored that if two lovers cross the bridge together and kiss at the crest of it, they will be together forever. 

Another similar urban legend is that if someone crosses Crim Dell alone, they  will always be alone.

Playboy Magazine's rankings
Tour guides at the College often tell prospective students that Playboy magazine once rated Crim Dell as "the second most romantic spot on a college campus" in America. No one is entirely sure where, or how, this rumor started, but it has been confirmed as false.

Stage 3 of W&M's "Triathlon"
One tradition includes William & Mary's own version of a triathlon (aptly called "The Triathlon"). It is a set of three tasks to be completed by each student prior to graduation. These include jumping the wall of the Governor's Palace in Colonial Williamsburg after hours, streaking through the Sunken Garden, and swimming in Crim Dell. The three tasks of the Triathlon do not need to be completed at the same time.  However, some students choose to complete all tasks in immediate succession, all while completely undressed.  This feat is referred to as "The Ironman Triathlon."

References

1966 establishments in Virginia
Bridges completed in 1966
Buildings and structures in Williamsburg, Virginia
College of William & Mary
Pedestrian bridges in Virginia
Wooden bridges in Virginia